Dahler is a surname. Notable people with the surname include:

Don Dahler (born 1960), American journalist and writer
Ed Dahler (1926–2012), American basketball player
Oliver Dahler (born 1969), German water polo player
P. F. Dahler (1883–1948), Dutch politician

See also
Bahler